Santa Rita de Sampa is an album released by Brazilian singer Rita Lee, on September 4, 1997 by Universal Music. This album marked the return of Rita Lee, after a while recovering from a domestic accident.

Track listing

References

Rita Lee albums
1997 albums